The Coca-Cola Scholars Foundation, or CCSF is a non-profit organization that works on behalf and at the direction of the Coca-Cola system (including The Coca-Cola Company, the world's largest producer of non-alcoholic beverages, and its many subsidiaries) to provide scholarships to some 1,400 students annually in amounts totaling over $3.4 million each year. The organization is based in Atlanta, Georgia.

History 
As Coca-Cola was approaching its centennial in 1986, leaders in the bottling industry decided to make a large financial gift that then became the Coca-Cola Scholars Program. In its first year, 150 graduating seniors planning on attending college were awarded four-year grants. Later, those grants grew into $20,000 scholarships for 50 students annually and $10,000 scholarships for another 200 students annually ($5,000/year for 4 years and $2,500/year for four years respectively).

Now, the Coca-Cola Scholars Foundation awards $20,000 grants to 150 rising college freshman annually.

The Foundation launched in 2022 a programme to train 7000 african women.

Selection 
Typically, the Foundation receives between 85,000 and 110,000 applications, from which around 2,000 are selected as Semifinalists. Regional representation across the United States is considered in this step.

The 2,000 Semifinalists are then asked to complete a written application to select approximately 250 Regional Finalists. From this stage, Regional Finalists complete interviews with prior recipients and CCSF staff after which 150 Coca-Cola Scholars are selected.

Coca-Cola Scholars are invited to Atlanta for Coca-Cola Scholars Weekend, where they participate in a Leadership Development Institute to further develop their leadership skills, tour local landmarks, engage with Coca-Cola Scholar alumni, and participate in a group community service project. The Scholars are also the guests of honor at the annual Scholars Banquet, where they are celebrated by representatives from the Coca-Cola system, educators, local dignitaries, and sponsors.

Eligibility 
In order to be eligible for a Coca-Cola Scholars Program scholarship, one must be a current high school or home-school senior planning to graduate from a school or program in the United States during the academic year in which application is made. Additionally, students must be U.S. Citizens, U.S. Nationals, U.S. Permanent Residents, Temporary Residents (legalization program), Refugees, Asylee, Cuban-Haitian Entrants, or Humanitarian Parolees. Furthermore, they must plan to pursue a degree at an accredited U.S. post-secondary institution and carry a minimum 3.00 GPA at the end of their junior year of high school. Applicants may not be children or grandchildren of employees, officers, or owners of Coca-Cola bottling companies, The Coca-Cola Company or any other bottler or Company divisions or subsidiaries.

Notable Coca-Cola Scholars 

 Michael J. Freedman, Robert E. Kahn Professor of Computer Science at Princeton University
 Melissa Schettini Kearney, Neil Moskowitz Professor of Economics at the University of Maryland
 Elise Stefanik, U.S. Representative from New York
 Mondaire Jones, U.S. Representative from New York 
 Ben Sasse, U.S. Senator from Nebraska
 Jake Sullivan, U.S. National Security Advisor
 Michael Tubbs, Mayor of Stockton, California
 Alex B. Morse, Mayor of Holyoke, Massachusetts
 Kathryn Minshew, Founder of The Muse
 Cara Mund, Miss America 2018
 Ericka Dunlap, Miss America 2003
 Katori Hall, playwright, journalist, and actress
 Leila Janah, Founder and CEO of Samasource and LXMI
 Paula Broadwell, Military scholar and author
 Katrina Shankland, Wisconsin state representative
 Nadya Okamoto, social entrepreneur and activist 
 Neha Gupta, founder of Empower Orphans and recipient of the Children's International Peace Prize
 Michelle Wu, Mayor of Boston

References 

Coca-Cola
Scholarships in the United States
Organizations established in 1986
1986 establishments in Georgia (U.S. state)